The Purificación River (Jalisco) is a river of Mexico.

See also
List of rivers of Mexico

References

Rivers of Jalisco